Gentiana triflora (三花龙胆 san hua long dan in Chinese, called clustered gentian in English) is a tall, flowering perennial plant in the genus Gentiana native to higher-elevation (600–1000 m) meadows and forests of China (Hebei, Heilongjiang, Jilin, Liaoning, Nei Mongol), Mongolia, Eastern Russia, Korea and Japan.

Gentian blue petals predominantly contain the unusually blue and stable anthocyanin gentiodelphin (delphinidin 3-O-glucosyl-5-O-(6-O-caffeoyl-glucosyl)-3′-O-(6-O-caffeoyl-glucoside)).

References

triflora
Flora of China